The 2nd Golden Horse Awards (Mandarin:第2屆金馬獎) took place on October 30, 1963 at Kuo Kuang Cinema in Taipei, Taiwan.

Winners and nominees 
Winners are listed first, highlighted in boldface.

References

2nd
1963 film awards
1963 in Taiwan